Bogoria is a Polish coat of arms. It was used by several szlachta families in medieval Poland and later under the Polish–Lithuanian Commonwealth, branches of the original medieval Bogoriowie family as well as families connected with the Clan by adoption.

History
The coat of arms was first attributed to Michał Bogorya, whose name was first recorded in the papers of Trzemeszno monastery, when he was given the title of count, and in a decree granting privileges to the Holy Cross monastery near Sandomierz around 1069. According to legend, Bolesław II the Bold (Bolesław Śmiały), armed with only 3,000 of his cavalry, attacked a much larger band of Polovtsy near Snowskie, striking down their leader. During the battle a colonel called Michał Bogorya proved extraordinary courage and bravery, bearing several wounds and arrows in his body. Bolesław, upon returning from the battle and hearing of his bravery, saw Bogorya and extracted the arrows from his chest, broke them with his own hands and conferred them on Bogorya and his descendants as an eternal honour.

Blazon
The coat of arms consists of two broken white (or silver) arrows pointing in opposite directions—one up and one down—on a red (or blue/green) field. The helm bears a peacock with its tail spread and its beak pointing to the shield's right, holding an arrow likewise broken and twisted upward.

Notable bearers
Notable bearers of this coat of arms include:

 Bogoriowie (knights)
 Jarosław z Bogorii i Skotnik 
 Piotr z Bogorii i Skotnik 
 Stanisława z Bogorii i Skotnik 
 Mikołaj z Bogorii i Skotnik 
 Wojciech z Bogorii i Żminogrodu
 The family of Mstislav Rostropovich, Russian cellist and conductor of Polish descent
 Marcjan Dominik Wołłowicz
 Andrzej Mokronowski
 Władysław Wołłowicz
 Franciszek Bohomolec
 Ostafi Wołłowicz

Gallery

Paintings

See also
 Polish heraldry
 Heraldic family
 List of Polish nobility coats of arms

Bibliography
 Kasper Niesiecki, Jan Nepomucen Bobrowicz: Herbarz polski Kaspra Niesieckiego S. J. T. 3. Lipsk: Breitkopf i Haertel, 1841, s. 194-198.
 Tadeusz Gajl: Herbarz polski od średniowiecza do XX wieku : ponad 4500 herbów szlacheckich 37 tysięcy nazwisk 55 tysięcy rodów. L&L, 2007. .
 Alfred Znamierowski: Herbarz rodowy. Warszawa: Świat Książki, 2004, s. 91. .
 Józef Szymański: Herbarz średniowiecznego rycerstwa polskiego. Warszawa: PWN, 1993, s. 86-88. .
 Józef Szymański: Herbarz rycerstwa polskiego z XVI wieku. Warszawa: DiG, 2001, s. 209. .

References

Bogorya